Peter Orner is an American writer. He is the author of two novels, two story collections and a book of essays. Orner holds the Professorship of English and Creative Writing at Dartmouth College and was formerly a professor of creative writing at San Francisco State University. He spent 2016 and 2017 on a Fulbright in Namibia teaching at the University of Namibia.

Early life and education
Orner was born in Chicago. He graduated from the University of Michigan in 1990. He later earned a Juris Doctor degree from Northeastern University School of Law, and an MFA from the Iowa Writer's Workshop.

Career
In 2001 Orner published his first book, Esther Stories,. It won a prize from the American Academy of Arts and Letters, the Goldberg Prize for Jewish Fiction, and was a finalist for the Pen Hemingway Prize, the Young Lion's Award from the New York Public Library, and was named a Notable Book of the Year by The New York Times. Of Esther Stories, The New York Times wrote, "Orner doesn't just bring his characters to life, he gives them souls."

In 2006, Orner published his first novel, The Second Coming of Mavala Shikongo, which was set in Namibia, where Orner worked as an English teacher in the 1990s; it won the Bard Fiction Prize and was a finalist for the Los Angeles Times Book Prize. Orner was awarded a Guggenheim Fellowship in 2006, as well as the two-year Lannan Foundation Literary Fellowship in 2007 and 2008.

Orner served as editor of two non-fiction books, Underground America (2008) and Hope Deferred: Narratives of Zimbabwean Lives (2010), both published by McSweeney's / Voice of Witness. His 2011 novel, Love and Shame and Love received positive reviews and was a New York Times Editor's Choice Book, and California Book Award winner.

In 2013, Little Brown released two books by Orner: a new edition of Esther Stories (with an introduction by Marilynne Robinson) and a new collection of stories, Last Car Over the Sagamore Bridge.

Orner's stories and essays have appeared in The Atlantic monthly, The New York Times, the San Francisco Chronicle, The Paris Review, Granta, McSweeney's, The Believer, and the Southern Review. His work has been anthologized in Best American Stories, The Best American Nonrequired Reading, and twice won a Pushcart Prize.

Orner is a Professor of English and Creative Writing at Dartmouth College. He has taught at San Francisco State University, The University of Iowa Writers' Workshop, The Warren Wilson MFA Program, The University of Montana, Washington University in St. Louis, Miami University, Bard College, and Charles University in Prague, Czech Republic.

A film version of one of Orner's stories, The Raft, with a screenplay by Orner and director Rob Jones, and starring Edward Asner has played a number of film festivals.

In 2016, Orner released a collection of essays, Am I Alone Here?, which was named a finalist for the National Book Critics Circle Awards in their Criticism category. The book has garnered positive reviews in The New York Times, the New Yorker, and a number of other publications.

Orner's newest collection of stories, Maggie Brown & Others, was released on July 2, 2019, and has received overwhelmingly positive reviews from the likes of the New York Times, Washington Post and Chicago Tribune.

Personal
His older brother is Eric Orner, the creator of the comic The Mostly Unfabulous Social Life of Ethan Green. He also has two younger siblings, William and Rebecca Orner. Orner has a long-time association with Camp Nebagamon, an overnight camp at Lake Nebagamon in northern Wisconsin, where he has been a counselor, wilderness trip leader, and village director. He has also worked as human rights observer in Chiapas, Mexico, a cab driver in Iowa City, and a sewer department worker for the city of Highland Park, Illinois, where he once worked side-by-side with Alex Gordon, a Chicago-based journalist and author of College: The Best Five Years of Your Life.

Honors
Edward Lewis Wallant Award (for Maggie Brown & Others, 2020)
National Book Critics Circle Awards, Finalist in Criticism Category (2016)
California Book Awards, Silver Medal for Fiction (2012)
Virginia Commonwealth University First Novelist Award (2007)
Guggenheim Fellowship (2006)
Lannan Literary Fellowship (2006)
Bard Fiction Prize (2007)
Finalist, Los Angeles Times Book Prize Best Fiction (2007)
Rome Prize in Literature, American Academy of Arts and Letters (2002–2003)
Samuel Goldberg Award for Jewish Fiction
New York Times Notable Book (for Esther Stories and Maggie Brown & Others)
Finalist, PEN/Hemingway Award
Finalist, Young Lions Fiction Prize (2002)
Finalist, John Sargent Sr. First Novel Prize (2006)

Bibliography

 Am I Alone Here? 
Esther Stories
Last Car Over the Sagamore Bridge
Love and Shame and Love
The Second Coming of Mavala Shikongo
Hope Defeferred (Editor)
Underground America (Editor)
Lavil: Life, Love and Death in Port-au-Prince (Editor)

References

External links

Orner's Esther Stories, The New York Times
An interview with Orner
Excerpts from The Second Coming of Mavala Shikongo
"First Love", a novel excerpt, Narrative Magazine.
2007 Bard Fiction Prize
VCU First Novelist Prize
Underground America: Narratives of Undocumented Lives
Interview with Peter Orner on Notebook on Cities and Culture

Year of birth missing (living people)
Living people
21st-century American novelists
American male novelists
Writers from San Francisco
Iowa Writers' Workshop alumni
American male short story writers
University of Michigan alumni
21st-century American short story writers
21st-century American male writers
San Francisco State University faculty
The Believer (magazine) people
Dartmouth College faculty
Warren Wilson College faculty
University of Montana faculty
Washington University in St. Louis faculty
Miami University faculty
Bard College faculty
Academic staff of Charles University
Northeastern University School of Law alumni